Huang Qijiang (born 5 October 1968) is a Chinese water polo player. He competed in the men's tournament at the 1988 Summer Olympics.

References

1968 births
Living people
Chinese male water polo players
Olympic water polo players of China
Water polo players at the 1988 Summer Olympics
Place of birth missing (living people)
Asian Games medalists in water polo
Water polo players at the 1990 Asian Games
Water polo players at the 1994 Asian Games
Medalists at the 1990 Asian Games
Medalists at the 1994 Asian Games
Asian Games gold medalists for China
Asian Games silver medalists for China